Gonypetyllis semuncialis is one of the smallest species of praying mantis and "scarcely reach(es) one centimeter in length."

See also
List of mantis genera and species

References

Mantidae
Insects described in 1891